Diverson Mlozi (born 13 September 1989)  is a Malawian footballer, who currently plays for Big Bullets FC in Super League of Malawi.

Club career 
Diverson Mlozi debuted as a soccer player in 2008 with Big Bullets FC, a club in which he remains to date. The same year of his debut he managed to be the top scorer in the league with 14 goals. In 2012, he won the Carlsberg Charity Cup and the Presidential Cup with the club.

He signed for Malanti Chiefs in September 2014.

In 2016, return home to join Big Bullets.

International career 
He was capped once by the Malawi national football team, playing the game in 2009.

References

External links 

1989 births
Living people
People from Blantyre
Malawian footballers
Malawi international footballers
Malawian expatriate footballers
Association football forwards
Nyasa Big Bullets FC players